2014–15 Hong Kong Senior Challenge Shield is the 113th season of one of the Asian oldest football knockout competitions, Hong Kong Senior Challenge Shield. Only 9 teams enter this edition, with one game being played in First Round before the Quarter-final stage. The competition is only open to teams that play in the Hong Kong Premier League.

Calendar

Bracket

Bold = winner
* = after extra time, = penalty shootout score

Fixtures and results

First round

Quarter-finals

Semi-finals

Final

MATCH OFFICIALS
Assistant referees:
Lam Nai Kei
Fok Pong Shing
Fourth official: Lau Fong Hei
LP Local Player
FP Foreign Player

MATCH RULES
90 minutes. (1st Half Added Time: 2 mins, 2nd Half Added Time: min)
30 minutes of extra-time if necessary.
Penalty shoot-out if scores still level.
Seven named substitutes
Maximum of 3 substitutions.

External links
 Senior Shield - Hong Kong Football Association

2013-14
Shield
2014–15 domestic association football cups